Black Reign may refer to:

 Black Reign (album), a 1993 album by Queen Latifah
 Black Reign (EP), a 2018 EP by Avenged Sevenfold
 Black Reign (wrestler), American professional wrestler better known by the name Goldust
 'Black Reign", a song by Quiet Riot, from the album Rehab
 “Black Reign”, The second album of the Prophets of Rage

See also
 Black Rain (disambiguation)